The women's 800 metres event at the 2005 Summer Universiade was held on 17–20 August in Izmir, Turkey.

Medalists

Results

Heats

Semifinals

Final

References
Finals results
Full results
Heats results

Athletics at the 2005 Summer Universiade
2005 in women's athletics